The 2007 Asian Women's Softball Championship was an international softball tournament which featured eleven nations which was held from 19–23 August 2007 in Jakarta, Indonesia.

Final ranking

 / 

Source:Softball Confederation of Asia

References

Asian Women's Softball Championship
International sports competitions hosted by Indonesia
2007 in Indonesian sport
Softball in Indonesia
2007 in Indonesian women's sport